This is a list of some Spanish words of Germanic origin.

The list includes words from Visigothic, Frankish, Langobardic, Middle Dutch, Middle High German, Middle Low German, Old English, Old High German, Old Norse, Old Swedish, English, and finally, words which come from Germanic with the specific source unknown.

Some of these words existed in Latin as loanwords from other languages. Some of these words have alternate etymologies and may also appear on a list of Spanish words from a different language. Some words contain non-Germanic elements (see béisbol in the Middle English section). Any form with an asterisk (*) is unattested and therefore hypothetical.

Alphabetical list

A
aguantar "to put up with" (< maybe It agguantare, from guanto "gauntlet" < Old Provençal < OFr guant < Frankish *want)
aguante "patience, tolerance"

B
bala "bullet" (< Fr balle < MFr < Northern It balla < Lombardic balla, palla < PGmc *ballô, cf. Eng ball, Ger Ball)
abalear "to shoot"
balear "to shoot"
balcón "balcony" (< It balcone < OIt balcone "scaffold" < Lombardic *balko, *balkon- "beam", PGmc *balkô "beam", cf. Eng balk)
banco "bench; bank" (OFr bank < Latin "bench" Back then banking was done "over the bench")
banca "bench, seat"
banda "band, group" (< Fr bande < Old Provençal banda "regiment of troops" < WGmc *banda or maybe Gothic bandwō "flag, sign")
bandada "flock of birds, group of animals"
bandera "flag"
bando "edict, mandate" (< Fr ban < Frankish ban)
bando "faction, party, side" (< maybe Gothic bandwō "flag, sign")
bandido "outlaw, bandit"
bandolero "outlaw, bandit"
banquete "banquet" (< Fr banquet < It banchetto "light repast between meals", dim. of banco "bench" < Lombardic *bank, panch < PGmc *bankiz, cf. bench)
barón "baron" (< maybe Frankish *baro "free man")
bistec, bisté, biftec "steak" (< Eng beefsteak, from beef (< OFr buef "ox; beef", cf. Sp buey)+ steak (< ON steik, cf. Eng stick))
bigote "moustache"  (< maybe German bei Gott, "by God")
bisonte "bison" (< Latin bison, bisōntis, of Germanic origin, cf Dutch wisent)
blanco "white" (< Germanic *blank)
bloque "block" (< Fr bloc < Dutch blok)
bloquear "to block"
bordar "to embroider" (< maybe Germanic *brŭzdan, cf English board, Dutch boord)
bordado "embroidery"
borde "edge" (< Fr bord < Frankish bord "side of the ship")
a bordo "on board"
botar "to bounce" (< Germanic *bōtan "to hit", cf Eng beat, Dutch boten)
bote "bounce"
bote "boat" (< OEng bāt)
bramar "to roar, bellow" (< maybe Gothic *bramôn)
bramido "roar, bellow"
brecha "breach, opening"
brindis "toast (with drinks)"
brida "bridle"
brocha "broach"
brotar "to sprout"
bulevar "boulevard" (Middle Dutch "bolwerc", Dutch "bolwerk" , also from Dutch: English "bulwark")
buque "ship, vessel"
burgués "bourgeoisie", "member of the middle class" (cf Dutch burg "fortified city", burger "civilian")

C
carpa "carp"
chocar "to crash, collide"
cinc "zinc"
club "club, association"
cobalto "cobalt"
comarca "region", specifically "comarcas of Spain", etc. (second element only)
Col(cabbage) = Kohl

D

E
equipar "to equip" : from Proto-Germanic *skipōną (“to ship, sail, embark”); akin to Gothic 𐍃𐌺𐌹𐍀 (skip, “ship”). Compare with Old High German scif, German Schiff, Icelandic skip, Old English scip (“ship”), Old Norse skipja (“to fit out a ship”). See ship.

F
filibustero "filibuster"
film "film"
filtro; filtrar "filter" (noun; verb)
flotar; flota; flotilla "float"
folclore "folklore" (from English folklore)
fornido "strong, robust"
fornir "provide"
forrar "cover"
frambuesa "raspberry"
franco "candid"
Franco "franc (currency)"
franqueo "postage"
frasco "bottle"
fresco "cool"
fútbol, futbol "football"

G
gabardina "raincoat"
gaita "bagpipes" (especially Galician bagpipes)
gaje "perk"
galán "a gallant person"
galante "gallant"
galardón "award"
galope "gallop"
ganado "livestock"
ganar "to win"
ganso; gansa "goose"
garaje "garage"
garantía "warranty"
garbo "grace/elegance"
gardenia "gardenia"
garrote "club"
gavilán "hawk"
González (gunðe-salaz) "war-hall / castle"
grabar "to record"
gripe, gripa "flu"
gris "grey"
grosella "currant/gooseberry"
grupo "group/band"
guadaña "scythe"
guagua (bus)
guante "glove" (< Cat guant< Frankish *want)
guantelete "gauntlet" (< Fr gantelet, dim. of gant "glove")
guarcanión
guarda "guard" (< Germanic *warda "a search with sight" < *wardôn "to pay attention")
aguardar "to wait for"
guardar "to save, guard"
guardia "the act of guarding"
guarir "to cure; to subsist; to recover" (< Germanic *warjan)
guarecer "to shelter, protect"
guarida "den, shelter for animals; shelter"
guarnición "garrison"
guerra "war"
guerrilla "guerilla"
gueto "ghetto"
guía "a guide"
guiar "to guide"
guillotina "guillotine"
guión "script/hyphen"
guirnalda "wreath"
guisa "guise"
guisar "cook/stew)
Guzmán (guts/man) Goodman

H
hacha "hatchet/ax"
halar, jalar "to pull"
hato "herd"
heraldo "herald"

I
instalar "to install"

J
jardín "garden"

K

L
lastre "ballast"
líder "leader"
lieja "liege"
lista "list"
listón "ribbon"
lote "lot/portion"
lotería "lottery/bingo"

M

maniquí "mannequin"
marcar "to mark"
marchar "to march"
mariscal "marshal"
marqués "marquis"
marquesina "marquee"
marta "minx"
mascota "a pet"
masón "mason"
mástil "mast"

N
nórdico "nordic"
norte "north"

O
oeste "west"
orgullo "pride"

P
palco "box"
papel "paper/role"
paquete "packet"
placa "plaque/license plate"

Q
quilla "keel"

R
rachear see rancho
rancho "ranch" from French ranger, from Old French ranc, from Frankish *hring or some other Germanic source
raza "race (lineage)" from Italian razza "race, lineage" from Langobard raiza "line, race" (trans. from Latin 'linea sanguinis' "bloodline of descent"), akin to OHG reiza "line" 
raspar "to scrape"
ratón "mouse"
refrescar "to refresh"
reno "reindeer"
retaguardia "rearguard"
rico(a) "rich/tasty"
rifa "raffle"
rifle "rifle"
riqueza "wealth/riches"
robar "to rob"
robo "robbery"
rocín "nag"
ron "rum"
ropa "clothing"
rorcual "rorqual"
rueca "spinning wheel"
rufián "ruffian"
rumba "rumba"
ruso (but see Etymology of Rus)

S
sacar "to take out"
sajón "Saxon"
sala "living room, room (in general)"
salón "salon, room (in general)"
saxofón (first element only)
sopa "soup" 
sud/sur "south"
sueco "Swede"
suizo "Swiss"

T
tacha "blemish"
tachuela "tack"
taco "taco"
tacón "heel"
talar "to cut"
tampón "tampon"
tapa "top"
tapar "to cover"
tapia "wall"
tapón "plug"
tarjeta "card", cognate with English "target"
teta "tit"
teutón "Teuton"
toalla "towel"
toldo "awning"
tope "top/stop"
torio "thorium"
trampa "trap/trick"
tregua "truce" 
trepar "to climb"
trombón "trombone"
trompa "trunk/horn"
trompo "spinning top"
tropa "troop"
trotar "to trot"
tungsteno "tungsten"
tupé "toupee"

U
ufano "a smug/boastul person"

V
vagón "wagon"
valquiria "Valkyrie"
vals "waltz"
vanadio "vanadium"
vandalismo "vandalism" (second element only)
venda "bandage"
vermut "vermouth"

W
wagneriano "Wagnerian"

X

Y
yate "yacht"
yelmo "helmet"
yodo "iodine"

Z

By origin

Franconian
Old Frankish evolved to Old Dutch between 500 and 800 AD. Around 1200 AD Old Dutch evolved to Middle Dutch. Around the 16th century, Modern Dutch evolved out of Middle Dutch.

Frankish 
aguantar= to endure, bear, resist: from Italian agguantare "to retain, take hold of" (originally "to detain with gauntlets"), from a- + guanto "gauntlet", from Frankish (*)want (see guante below) + verbal suffix -are (suffix changed to -ar in Spanish).
alojar= to lodge, to house, to provide hospitality: from Catalan allotjar, from llotja from Old French loge, see lonja below.
borde= border, edge: from Old French bord "side of a ship, border, edge", from Frankish (*)bord "table", from Germanic (*)burd-.
bordar= to embroider: from Frankish (*)bruzdon (source of Old French brouder, brosder and French broder), from Germanic (*)bruzd- "point, needle", from the IE root (*)bhrs-dh-, from (*)bhrs-, from (*)bhar-, "point, nail."
bosque= forest, woods: from Catalan of Provençal of Old French bosc, from Germanic (*)busk- "brush, underbrush, thicket" (source of Old High German busc).
bosquejo= a sketch, outline, rough draft: from Spanish bosquejar "to sketch, to outline", probably from Catalan bosquejar from bosc, see bosque above.
destacar= to detach troops: from French détachar (influenced by Spanish atacar), from Old French destachier "to unattach", from des- "apart, away" + atachier, a variation of estachier, from estaca, from Frankish stakka, see estaca below in Germanic section.
destacar= to stand out, to emphasize: from Italian staccare "to separate", from Old French destacher, destachier, see destacar above.
estandarte= a military standard: from Old French estandart, probably from Frankish (*)standhard "standard that marks a meeting place", (implicit sense: "that which stands firmly"), from (*)standan "to stand", (from Germanic (*)standan, from the IE root (*)sta- "to stand") + (*)hard "hard, firm", see ardid below in Germanic section.
guante= glove, gauntlet: from Catalan guant "gauntlet", from Frankish (*)want "gauntlet."
lonja= market, building where merchants and sellers gather: from regional Catalan llonja (Modern Catalan llotja), from Old Frenchlogo "dwelling, shelter", from Frankish (*)laubja "covering, enclosure", from Germanic (*)laubja "shelter" (implicit sense "roof made of bark"), from the IE root (*)leup- "to peel."
oboe= an oboe: from French hautbois from haut (from Frankish *hauh "high" and Latin altus "high") + bois "wood", see bosque above.
 ranchear, rancho= ranch, From French ranger, from Old French ranc, from Frankish *hring or some other Germanic source (Old High German hring "circle, ring"), from Proto-Germanic *khrengaz "circle, ring". Shares the root with rank.

Old Dutch

Middle Dutch

amarrar= to moor a boat, to tie, to fasten: from French amarrer, "to moor", from Middle Dutch aanmarren "to fasten", from aan "on" (from Germanic (*)ana, (*)anō, from the IE root (*)an-) + marren "to fasten, to moor a boat." See Modern Dutch aanmeren.
baluarte= bulwark: from Old French boloart "bulwark, rampart, terreplein converted to a boulevard", from Middle Dutch bolwerc "rampart". See Modern Dutch bolwerk.
bulevar: from French boulevard, from Middle Dutch: bolwerc "rampart". See Modern Dutch bolwerk.
maniquí= a mannequin, dummy, puppet: from French mannequin, from (probably via Catalan maniquí) Dutch, from Middle Dutch mannekijn "little man", from man "a man" (see alemán below in Germanic section) + the diminutive suffix -ken, -kin, -kijn, from West Germanic (*)-kin (cf. Modern German -chen) See Modern Dutch manneken (Belgium).
rumbo= direction, course, route, pomp, ostentation: from Old Spanish rumbo "each of the 32 points on a compass", from Middle Dutch rume "space, place, rhumb line, storeroom of a ship", from Germanic rūmaz "space, place", from the IE root (*)reu- "space, to open". See Modern Dutch ruim.

Modern Dutch
.
babor= port side of a ship: from French babord "portside", from Dutch bakboord "left side of a ship", literally "back side of a ship" (from the fact that most ships were steered from the starboard side), from bak "back, behind", (from Germanic (*)bakam) + boord "board, side of a ship", see borde below (in Germanic section).  Also see estribor' "starboard" below in the Germanic section
berbiquí= carpenter's brace: from regional French veberquin (French vilebrequin), from Dutch wimmelken, from wimmel "auger, drill, carpenter's brace" + -ken, a diminutive suffix, see maniquí below in Middle Dutch section.

Anglo-Frisian

Old English

arlequín= harlequin: from Italian arlecchino, from Old French Herlequin "mythic chief of a tribe", probably from Middle English Herle king, from Old English Herla cyning, Herla Kyning literally King Herla, a king of Germanic mythology identified with Odin/Woden.  Cyning "king" is from Germanic (*)kunjan "family" (hence, by extension royal family), from the IE root (*)gen- "to birth, regenerate".
bote= a small, uncovered boat: from Old French bot, from Middle English bot, boot, from Old English bāt, from Germanic (*)bait-, from the IE root (*)bheid- "to split".
este= east: from French est, from Middle English est, from Old English ēast, from Germanic (*)aust-, from the IE root (*)awes-, aus "to shine".
norte= north: from Old French nord, from Old English north, from Germanic (*)north-, from the IE root (*)nr-to "north", from (*)nr- "wiktionary:under, to the left"
oeste= west: from Middle English west, from Old English west, from Germanic (*)west-, from (*)wes-to-, from (*)wes-, from (*)wespero- "evening, dusk".
sud-= south (combining form): from Old French sud "south", from Old English sūth, from Germanic (*)sunthaz, from the IE root (*)sun-, swen-, variants of (*)sāwel- "sun".
sur= south: from French sud, from Old English sūth, see sud- above.

Middle English

Modern English

 bar
 básquetbol= basketball
 béisbol= baseball: from Modern English, from base (from Old French base, from Latin basis "base, pedestal", from Ancient Greek βασις basis, from βαινειν bainein "to go, to come", from the IE root) + ball from Middle English bal, (from either Old Norse böllr OR Old English (*)beall) both from Germanic (*)ball-, from the IE root (*)bhel- "to swell".
 bit
 boxear= to box: from Modern English, from Middle English box.
 byte
 chatear= chat (on the Internet)
 cheque= cheque/check
 chequeo= checkup
 choque= shock 
 clic= click (on a mouse)
 cliquear= to click (mouse)
 club
 dólar
 cómic= comic, ultimately Greek borrowing (adj.)
 escáner= scanner
 escanear= to scan
 eslógan= slogan
 estándar= standard
 esmoquin= tuxedo, from smoking
 fax
 flash
 fútbol= football
 gay= English, from French
 glamoroso= glamorous
 hall
 hockey
 interfaz= interface
 internet
 jersey= (pullover, sweater)
 líder= leader
 link =(as in the Internet)
marketing
 mitin= meeting
 módem= modem
 mouse (device)
 náilon= nylon
 píxel= pixel
 pudin= pudding
 ranking/ranquin
 rock = (as in music)
 rosbif = roast beef
 sandwich
sexy/sexi
 shampú or champú "shampoo"
 shock
 software
startup
 show
 examen "test"
 telemarketing, know-how
 turista= tourist
 vagón= wagon
 voleibol = volleyball
 yanqui= yankee
 yate= yacht

Low German

Old Low German

Middle Low German

Modern Low German

High German

Old High German

banca= bench: see banco= bench below
banco= bench: from Old High German banc "bench, board"
banco= bank: from French banque "bank", from Italian banca "bench, money changer's table", from Old High German banc, see banco= bench above
banqueta= backless bench, stool, sidewalk (Mexico): diminutive of banca, see banca above.

Middle High German

Modern High German

North-Germanic

Old Norse

bistec= steak, beefsteak: from English beefsteak, from beef (ultimately from Latin bōs, bovis "cow", from the IE root (*)gwou- "ox, bull, cow") + steak, from Middle English steyke, from Old Norse steik "piece of meat cooked on  a spit", from Germanic (*)stik-, see estaca below in the Germanic section.

Other

Langobardic

palco= a balcony, balcony of a theater: from Italian palco, from Langobardic palko "scaffolding", from Germanic (*)balkōn "beam, crossbeam", see balcón below in Germanic section.

Visigothic

agasajar= to flatter: from agasajo (see agasajo below) + the verbal suffix -ar
agasajo= entertainment, kind reception, friendliness, flattery: from a- + Old Spanish gasajo "reception" from Visigothic  gasalja "companion, comrade", from ga- with, together (from the IE root (*)kom) + sal- "room, lodging" (see sala below in the Germanic section).
guardia= guard, bodyguard, protection: from Visigothic wardja "a guard", from Germanic wardaz, from the IE root (*)wor-to-, see guardar below in Germanic section.
guardián= guardian: from Visigothic wardjan accusative of wardja, see guardia above.
atacar= to attack: Old Italian attaccare "to fasten, join, unite, attack (implicit sense: to join in a battle)", changed from (*)estacar (by influence of a-, common verbal prefix) "to fasten, join", from Visigothic stakka "a stick, stake", from Germanic (*)stak-, see estaca in Germanic section.

Germanic of unidentified origin
abanderado= standard-bearer, also standard-bearing (adjective): from a- + bandera, (see bandera below) + -ado, from Latin -atus, noun suffix derived the adjective suffix -atus.
abandonar= to abandon: from Old French a bandon, from a + bandon "control" from ban "proclamation, jurisdiction, power", from Germanic (*)banwan, (*)bannan  "to proclaim, speak publicly".
abordar= to board a ship, to approach, to undertake: from a- + bordo "side of a ship", variation of borde, see borde below
abotonar: to button: from a- + botón "button", see botón below
abrasar= to burn, to parch: from a- + brasa "a coal, ember" (see brasa below) + the verbal suffix -ar
aguardar= to wait, wait for: from a- + guardar, see guardar below.
alemán= of Germany (adjective), the German language: from Late Latin Alemanni, an ancient Germanic tribe, from Germanic (*)alamanniz (represented in Gothic alamans), from ala- "all" + mannis, plural of manna-/mannaz "man" (Gothic manna) from the IE root (*)man- "man".
ardid= trick, scheme, ruse: from Old Spanish ardid "risky undertaking in war", from Catalan ardit (noun) "risky undertaking, strategy", from ardit (adjective) "daring, bold", from a Germanic source represented in Old High German harti "daring, bold" and hart "hard", both from the IE root (*)kor-tu-.
arenque= herring: possibly via French hareng, from Germanic (compare Old High German hārinc).
arpa= a harp: from French: harpe, from Germanic (*)harpōn-.
arrimar= to approach: possibly from Old French arrimer, arimer "to arrange the cargo in the storeroom of a ship", from Germanic (*)rūmaz "room"
atrapar= to trap, to ensnare: from French attraper, from Old French a- + trape "trap", from Germanic (*)trep- (seen in the Old English træppe) from the IE root (*)dreb-, from (*)der- "to run."
bala= a bullet: Italian balla/palla, from Germanic (*)ball-, see béisbol above in Old English section.
balcón== a balcony: from Italian balcone, from Old Italian balcone "scaffold", from Germanic (*)balkōn "beam, crossbeam", from the IE root (*)bhelg- "beam, board, plank."
balón= a large ball: from Italian ballone, pallone, balla (see bala above) + -one, an augmentive suffix, related to and possibly the source of Spanish -ón (in balón). see here.
banda= ribbon, band, sash: from Old French bande "knot, fastening", from Germanic '*band-', from the IE root (*)bhondh-, from (*)bhendh-.
banda= band, troop, musical group: from Germanic '*bandwa-', "standard, signal", also "group" (from the use of a military standard by some groups), from the IE root (*)bha- "to shine" (implicit sense "signal that shines").
bandera= banner: from Vulgar Latin (*)bandaria "banner", from Late Latin bandum "standard", from Germanic (*)bandwa,  see banda= group below
bandido= bandit, gangster: from Italian bandito "bandit", from bandire "to band together", from Germanic '*banwan, see abandonar above
banquete= a banquet: rom Old French banquet, diminutive of banc "bench, long seat", of Germanic origin, of the same family as the Old High German banc, see banco= bench above in Old High German section.
bisonte== Bison bison: from Latin bisontem (accusative of bison) "wisent (Bison bonasus)", from Germanic (*)wisand-, wisunt- (Old High German wisant, wisunt).
blanco= white, white person, blank: from Vulgar Latin (*)blancus, from Germanic (*)blank- "to shine", from the IE root.
bloque= a block, a bloc: from French bloc, from Middle Dutch blok "trunk of a tree", from a Germanic source represented in the Old High German bloh.
bohemio= a bohemian, of Bohemia, vagabond, eccentric, Gitano, Gypsy: from bohemio/Bohemia (from the belief that the Gitanos came from Bohemia), from Latin bohemus, from Boihaemum, literally "place of the Boi/Boii (from Celtic, see bohemio here) + Latin -haemum "home", from Germanic (*)haima "home", from the IE root (*)koi-mo-, from (*)koi-, variant of (*)kei- "bed, couch; beloved, dear".
bota= a boot: from or simply from the same source as French botte "boot", from Old French bote "boot", probably from the same source as Modern French pied bot "deformed foot" in which bot is from Germanic (*)būtaz, from the IE root (*)bhau- "to strike", see botar below.
botar= to throw, to bounce, to jump: from Old French boter, bouter "to open, to hit, to strike, to perforate", from Romance bottare "to strike, to push, to shove", from Germanic (*) buttan "to hit, to strike" from the IE root (*)bhau-.
bote+ a bounce: see botar above
botón= button: from Old French boton, bouton "button", from boter, bouter "to open, perforate", see botar above
boya= a buoy: probably from Old French boie, from Germanic, possibly from Old High German bouhhan, from Germanic (*)baukna- "signal", from the IE root (*)bha- "to shine".
brasa= a coal, ember: from Old French brese "a coal" (Modern French braise), probably from Germanic (*)bres-, (*)bhres-, from the IE root (*)bhreu-.
dibujar= to draw, represent with lines: older Spanish meanings include "to represent, to paint, to sculpt, to do wood carving", probably from Old French deboissier "to sculpt in wood", from de- + bois "wood", from Germanic (*)busk-, see bosque above.
estaca= a stake: from Germanic (*)stak-, from the IE root (*)steg- "pale, post pointed stick".
estribor= starboard side of a ship: from Old French estribord "starboard", (Modern French tribord), from a Germanic source (confer Old English stēorbord).  From Germanic (*)stiurjō "to steer", + Germanic (*)burd-, see borde above
grupo= group: rom Italian gruppo, from a Germanic word represented by Old High German kropf "beak."
guardar= to guard, watch over, keep, observe (a custom): from Germanic (*)wardōn "to look after, take care of", from the IE root (*)wor-to-, "to watch", from (*)wor-, (*)wer- "to see, watch, perceive".
sala= a room: from Germanic sal- "room, house", from the IE root (*)sol- "hamlet, human settlement."
salón= main room of a house (see sala above) + -on, augmentive suffix.
trampa= a trap: possibly from Germanic, from the same derivation as trampolín (see below) and atrapar (see above).
trampolín= a trampoline: from Italian trampolino "trampoline" (implicit sense: game of agility on stilts), from trampoli, plural of a Germanic word (*)tramp- (such as German trampeln and Old High German trampen, both meaning "to tread, trample"), from the IE root (*)dreb-, from (*)der- "to run."
vanguardia= vanguard: from Old Spanish avanguardia, from Catalan avantguarda from avant "before, advance", (from Latin ab- + ante "before") + guarda "guard", from Germanic wardaz, see guardia''' above in Visigothic section.

Latin words of Germanic origin

bisonte (from L bisont-, bison from Gmc, akin to OHG wisant, aurochs)
filtro; filtrar= "filter; to filter" from ML filtrum felt from Gmc, akin to OE felt, felt
jabon= "soap" from Latin sapon-, sapo, soap from Gmc

 Names 

 Forenames 
 Abelardo
 Adalberto
 Adela
 Adelaida
 Adelia
 Adelina
 Adelita
 Adolfito
 Adolfo
 Adosinda
 Alarico
 Alberto
 Alfonso
 Alfredo
 Alicia
 Alita
 Alonso
 Álvaro
 Amalia
 Amelia
 América
 Américo = Italian Amerigo from Visigothic Amalric from amal "labour, work" + ric "kingdom, rule, domain"
 Anselma
 Anselmo
 Armando
 Astrid
 Baldomero
 Balduino
 Baudelio
 Bermudo
 Bermundo
 Bernardino
 Bernardita
 Bernardo
 Berta
 Blanca
 Braulio
 Brunilda
 Bruno
 Canuto
 Carla
 Carlito
 Carlitos
 Carlos
 Carlota
 Carolina
 Claudomiro
 Clotilde
 Conrado
 Curro
 Dalia
 Eberardo
 Edelmira
 Edelmiro
 Edgardo
 Edmundo
 Eduardo
 Elodia
 Eloísa
 Elvira
 Ema
 Emelina
 Enrique
 Erico
 Ernesta
 Ernestina
 Ernesto
 Etelvina
 Federico
 Fernanda
 Fernando
 Fito
 Fran
 Franco
 Francisca
 Francisco
 Froilan
 Geraldo
 Gerardo
 Gertrudis
 Gervasio
 Gilberto
 Gisela
 Godofredo
 Gonzalo
 Godino = of Visigothic origin, from Gaut 'Goth' or guþ 'god'.
 Griselda
 Gualterio
 Guillermo
 Guiomar
 Gumersinda
 Gumersindo
 Gustavo
 Hélder 
 Herberto
 Heriberto
 Hermenegildo
 Hernán
 Hernando
 Hilda
 Hildegarda
 Hugo
 Ida
 Ildefonso
 Imelda
 Irma
 Isidro
 Isidoro
 Ivette
 Jordán
 Jordana
 Lalo
 Leonardo
 Leopoldo
 Lorena
 Ludovico
 Luis
 Luisa
 Luisina
 Lupe
 Lupita
 Matilde
 Miro
 Nando
 Nilda
 Nora
 Norberto
 Olegario
 Olga
 Olivia
 Óscar
 Osvaldo
 Paca
 Paco
 Pancho
 Paquita
 Paquito
 Ramiro
 Ramom
 Raimundo
 Roberto
 Rodolfo
 Rodrigo = from Germanic Hrodric/Hrēðrīc/Rørik/Hrœrekr (Roderick, Rodrick, Roderich; a compound of hrod 'renown' + ric 'power(ful)'), from the Proto-Germanic *Hrōþirīk(i)az; it was borne by the last of the Visigoth kings and is one of the most important Spanish personal names of Germanic origin.
 Rogelio
 Rolando
 Ronaldo
 Rosendo
 Sisenando
 Sisebuto

 Surnames 
 Alonso = Galician-Portuguese variant of Adalfuns.
 Álvarez = patronymic form of Álvaro
 Allariz = patronimic from Alaric
 Bermudez = patronimic from Bermudo from Gothic Bermund
 Enríquez = patronymic form of Enrique
 Fernández = patronymic form of Fernando
 García = patronymic form of Garces
 Godínez = patronymic form of Godino
 Gómez = patronymic form of Gome
 González = patronymic form of Gonzalo
 Guerra = From Gothic 'wirr'
 Guerrero = occupational name meaning warrior, from Germanic werra, modern German wirr ("confused")
 Guitiriz = patronimic form of Witiza
 Gutiérrez = patronymic form of Gutierre
 Guzmán = guts/man = goodman
 Manrique(z)= from the Gothic "Aimanreiks" = Man(male) ric (realm/kingdom/power)
 Henríque(z) = from the Gothic "Haimreiks" = Haim(village) ric (realm/kingdom/power)
 Hernández = patronymic form of Hernando
 Méndez = patronymic form of Mendo 
 Parra  =  from Gothic Grapevine
 Ramírez = patronymic form of Ramiro
 Rodríguez = patronymic form of Rodrigo
 Ruiz = patronymic form of Ruy, variant of Rodrigo
 Suevos = patronimic form of Suevo 
 Vélez = patronymic form of Vela, which itself is derived from Vigila (Wigila).

See also
 Arabic language influence on the Spanish language
 History of the Spanish language
 List of English words of Spanish origin
 List of French words of Germanic origin
 List of Galician words of Germanic origin
 List of Portuguese words of Germanic origin

ReferencesDiez, Etymologisches Wörterbuch der romanischen Sprachen, "Razza."
Breve diccionario etimológico de la lengua española by Guido Gómez de Silva
The American Heritage Dictionary of the English Language: Fourth Edition.  2000.

Germanic
Lists of loanwords of Germanic origin